Pyotr Yefimovich Todorovsky (26 August 1925 – 24 May 2013) was a Russian film director, screenwriter and cinematographer of Jewish origin. His son Valery Todorovsky is also a film director.

Career
Todorovsky joined the Red Army during World War II and drew on his war experiences for a number of films, including Rio-Rita (2008). In the 1950s, he worked as a cinematographer for Marlen Khutsiev. He liked to play guitar and composed songs for some of his films.

Todorovsky's early 1980s melodramas gained him wide popularity in the Soviet Union. They have been described as "delightfully unpretentious comedies, homourous and touching at the same time".

Todorovsky's Intergirl (1989) was the first Soviet film about prostitution and caused quite a stir. His next film Encore, Once More Encore! (1992) presents a grim picture of moral prostitution in a dull, provincial garrison town.

Awards
Todorovsky was named a People's Artist of Russia in 1985.  Encore, Once More, Encore! won the 1992 Nika Award for Best Film. Wartime Romance (1983) was nominated for the Academy Award for Best Foreign Language Film. It was also entered into the 34th Berlin International Film Festival, where Inna Churikova won the Silver Bear for Best Actress.

Filmography
Spring on Zarechnaya Street (1956)
Nevermore (1962)
Faithfulness (1965)
Magician (1967)
Urban Romance (1970)
It Was in May (1970) 
The Last Victim (1975) 
Wartime Romance (1983)
Waiting for Love (1981)
  Along the main street with orchestra  (1986)
Intergirl (1989)
Encore, Once More Encore! (1992)
What a Wonderful Game (1995)
Retro Threesome (1998)
Life Is Full of Fun (2001)
Riorita (2008)

References

External links

Todorovski in Xavier Muñoz's Per tu, Rio Rita, Omnia Books, 2018 - Biography of Enric Santeugini

1925 births
2013 deaths
Soviet film directors
Soviet screenwriters
Soviet film score composers
Male film score composers
Russian film directors
20th-century Russian screenwriters
20th-century Russian male writers
Male screenwriters
Russian male writers
Academic staff of High Courses for Scriptwriters and Film Directors
Academicians of the Russian Academy of Cinema Arts and Sciences "Nika"
Ukrainian Jews
20th-century male musicians
Soviet military personnel of World War II from Ukraine